Kvevlax is a church village in the municipality of Korsholm, Finland. Kvevlax became an independent parish in 1857. Until 1 January 1973 it was an independent municipality. Kvevlax has a lower grade primary education school, a kindergarten, a running track and an ice rink. There are two local grocery shops, a library and a bank.

Flight 311 air crash 

On 3 January 1961, a DC-3, the Aero O/Y Flight 311, crashed in Kvevlax, with the loss of all 25 on board. The DC-3 crash was blamed on alcohol-intoxicated and sleep-deprived pilots. The accident remains the worst in Finnish aviation history.

Landmarks 
 The Kvevlax Church, built in 1692. The church has a pulpit from 1696, while the organ is much newer, having been purchased in 1975.
 The Kvevlax UF house was opened in 1949, although the youth organization was formed back in 1895. The previous UF house burned down in the winter of 1940.
 The memorial to the air crash

External links 
 Aviation Safety Net

Former municipalities of Finland
Korsholm